The Ethiopian narrow-headed rat (Stenocephalemys albocaudata) is a species of rodent in the family Muridae.
It is found only in Ethiopia.
Its natural habitats are subtropical or tropical high-elevation shrubland and subtropical or tropical high-elevation grassland.

References

Stenocephalemys
Mammals of Ethiopia
Mammals described in 1914
Taxonomy articles created by Polbot
Endemic fauna of Ethiopia
Ethiopian montane moorlands